Stephen Aldrich (born 1941) is an American judge in Hennepin County, Minnesota.
According to the Star Tribune he has a pattern of making crude jokes at the expense of suspects and court officials.

Aldrich joked about sending a Somalian suspect to Guantanamo.
He joked about thinking about murdering his own wife.   He is a graduate of Grinnell College and the University of Minnesota Law School.

References

American judges
University of Minnesota Law School alumni
Living people
1941 births